Ben Malka is an Israeli footballer who plays for Maccabi Tzur Shalom.

Honours
Liga Leumit
2013–14

References

1989 births
Living people
Israeli Jews
Israeli footballers
Hapoel Kfar Saba F.C. players
Hapoel Nir Ramat HaSharon F.C. players
Hapoel Ra'anana A.F.C. players
Maccabi Netanya F.C. players
Beitar Jerusalem F.C. players
Hapoel Petah Tikva F.C. players
Maccabi Herzliya F.C. players
Hapoel Iksal F.C. players
Hapoel Ashkelon F.C. players
Hapoel Umm al-Fahm F.C. players
Hapoel Ironi Baqa al-Gharbiyye F.C. players
Hapoel Kafr Kanna F.C. players
Maccabi Ironi Kiryat Ata F.C. players
Maccabi Tzur Shalom F.C. players
Liga Leumit players
Israeli Premier League players
Footballers from Haifa
Israeli people of Moroccan-Jewish descent
Association football midfielders